In probability theory and statistical mechanics, the Gaussian free field (GFF) is a Gaussian random field, a central model of random surfaces (random height functions).  gives a mathematical survey of the Gaussian free field.

The discrete version can be defined on any graph, usually a lattice in d-dimensional Euclidean space. The continuum version is defined on Rd or on a bounded subdomain of Rd. It can be thought of as a natural generalization of one-dimensional Brownian motion to d time (but still one space) dimensions: it is a random (generalized) function from Rd to R. In particular, the one-dimensional continuum GFF is just the standard one-dimensional Brownian motion or Brownian bridge on an interval.

In the theory of random surfaces, it is also called the harmonic crystal. It is also the starting point for many constructions in quantum field theory, where it is called the Euclidean bosonic massless free field.

Similarly to Brownian motion, which is the scaling limit of a wide range of discrete random walk models (see Donsker's theorem), the continuum GFF is the scaling limit of not only the discrete GFF on lattices, but of many random height function models, such as the height function of uniform random planar domino tilings, see . The planar GFF is also the limit of the fluctuations of the characteristic polynomial of a random matrix model, the Ginibre ensemble, see .

The structure of the discrete GFF on any graph is closely related to the behaviour of the simple random walk on the graph.

Definition of the discrete GFF

Let P(x, y) be the transition kernel of the Markov chain given by a random walk on a finite graph G(V, E). Let U be a fixed non-empty subset of the vertices V, and take the set of all real-valued functions  with some prescribed values on U. We then define a Hamiltonian by

 

It is not hard to show that the expected value  is the discrete harmonic extension of the boundary values from U (harmonic with respect to the transition kernel P), and the covariances  are equal to the discrete Green's function G(x, y).

So, in one sentence, the discrete GFF is the Gaussian random field on V with covariance structure given by the Green's function associated to the transition kernel P.

The continuum field

The definition of the continuum field necessarily uses some abstract machinery, since it does not exist as a random height function. Instead, it is a random generalized function, or in other words, a probability distribution on distributions (with two different meanings of the word "distribution").

Given a domain Ω ⊆ Rn, consider the Dirichlet inner product

 

Then take the Hilbert space closure with respect to this inner product, this is the Sobolev space .

Such a random field indeed exists, and its distribution is unique.

 

However, it exists as a random generalized function, since for any  we have

 

hence

 

is a well-defined finite random number.

Special case: n = 1

  where  form an orthonormal basis of 

So, in this case, it is a random continuous function.

On the other hand, for  it can indeed be shown to exist only as a generalized function, see .

Special case: n = 2

In dimension n = 2, the conformal invariance of the continuum GFF is clear from the invariance of the Dirichlet inner product. The corresponding two-dimensional conformal field theory describes a massless free scalar boson.

References

 

Statistical mechanics
Stochastic processes